Colcock is a surname. Notable people with the surname include:

Charles Colcock Jones Carpenter (1899–1969), D.D., LL.D, Bishop of the Alabama Episcopal Diocese
Richard W. Colcock (born 1806), Superintendent of the Citadel, (Military College of South Carolina), 1844–1852
William F. Colcock (1804–1889), U.S. Representative from South Carolina
Charles Colcock Jones (1804–1863), Presbyterian clergyman, educator, missionary, planter of Liberty County, Georgia